Meredyth Herold   is a Greek film and television actress best known for Singapore Sling (1990), To spiti stin exohi (1994) and To koritsi me tis valitses (1997).

As of 2011, she lived in the United States.

Awards 
 Thessaloniki International Film Festival: Best Actress

References

External links
 
 Mimis Tsakoniatis, Marie-Louise Bartholomew, Giannis Soldatos, Symeon Nikolaidis. Νικος Νικολαιδης 

Living people
Greek film actresses
20th-century Greek actresses
Greek television actresses
Greek people of American descent
Year of birth missing (living people)